Papathanasiou is a Greek family name. People with this name include:

Evangelos Papathanasiou, better known as Vangelis, musician.
Vassiliki Papathanasiou, better known as Vicky Leandros, singer.
Leandros Papathanasiou, better known as Leo Leandros, musician.
Aspasia Papathanasiou, Greek actress.
Andreas Papathanasiou (born 1983), Cypriot footballer.
Yannis Papathanasiou (born 1954), Greek politician.
Aimilios Papathanasiou (born 1973), Greek sailor.

Greek-language surnames
Surnames
Patronymic surnames